Suleymanovo (Söläymän) is a rural locality (a village) in Urgushevsky Selsoviet, Karaidelsky District, Bashkortostan, Russia. The population was 154 as of 2010. There are 5 streets.

Geography 
Suleymanovo is located 34 km southwest of Karaidel (the district's administrative centre) by road. Nikolo-Kazanka is the nearest rural locality.

References 

Rural localities in Karaidelsky District